South Beacon is the summit of a bold, flat-topped ridge rising to 2,210 m in the south part of Beacon Heights, in the Quartermain Mountains, Victoria Land. A ridge system connects South Beacon with West Beacon, 1.5 nautical miles (2.8 km) north, and East Beacon, 1.5 nautical miles (2.8 km) northeast. So named by the New Zealand Antarctic Place-Names Committee (NZ-APC) following geological work here by C.T. McElroy, G. Rose, and K.J. Whitby in 1980–81.

Mountains of Victoria Land
Scott Coast